Hugo Josef Jaeggi (15 May 1936 – 23 August 2018) was a Swiss photographer.

Biography 
Hugo Jaeggi completed his professional apprenticeship as a photographer with Ernst Räss from 1953 to 1956 in Solothurn after completing high school in 1953. In the period from 1958 to 1959 he worked as a cameraman for Swiss television. Hugo Jaeggi passed the master's examination in 1960. From that point on he ran his own photography business in Basel as a freelance photographer until 1974. From 1983 he lived and worked in Burg im Leimental (Canton of Basel-Landschaft). Jaeggi was constantly dedicated to his own photo projects with high artistic standards, especially in the area of portraits. Trips together led him – often with friend journalist Peter Jaeggi – to Guatemala, India, Belarus and African countries. He always used these orders to create his own, very personal and mostly black and white pictures in addition to the colored "mandatory part" for the media. While the reportage photos appeared in many different print media, including the Basler Zeitung magazine, the artist continuously completed his personal photographic work.

Jaeggi tried to capture his experiences and dreams again and again in newly composed pictures bathed in the special light. The classic parameters of the design, a well thought-out composition and narration in several narrative levels remained essential criteria for him. He used his tried-and-tested 35mm Leica camera with a 35 mm lens for over six decades.

"Hugo Jaeggi is also a virtuoso narrator. Above all, the encounter with people inspires him to record life stories and fates, to accompany developments, to observe changes and to think about these changes," wrote Peter Pfrunder, Director of the  about Hugo Jaeggi (in: Peter Jaeggi and Peter Pfrunder (ed.),  «Hugo Jaeggi. Nahe am Menschen: Fotografien», Benteli, Bern. ). The Fotostiftung Schweiz Winterthur archives over 600 silver gelatin prints by the artist (as of 2017).

Hugo Jaeggi's visual themes include: portrait, landscape, still life, everyday life, industry (Von Roll), work, several long-term projects, humanitarian issues and the like. a. in Switzerland and Europe: Belarus, Czech Republic, Africa: Tanzania, Asia: India, South America: Guatemala and others.

He taught at a Rudolf Steiner school until 2016. From 2006 Hugo Jaeggi used the digital camera to make changes in the immediate vicinity when he discovered the extraordinary nature of natural decay processes in the immediate vicinity of his house.

Jaeggi died of cancer in 2018 at the age of 82.

In 2019, the film Zudem ist der Traum oft Realität genug on the life and work of Hugo Jaeggi, directed by Matthias Leupold and Jérôme Depierre, was released on Schweizer Fernsehen.

Publications (selection) 

 «Grün 80», Friedrich Reinhardt, Basel, 1980. 
 «Hugo Jaeggi. Fotografien» (Kat., Text Urs Stahel), Kunstmuseum Solothurn, 1986. 
 Peter Jaeggi, «Menschen in der Tela – Gesichter und Geschichten aus der Fabrik», Aarcadia-Verlag, Solothurn, 1994. 
 Peter Jaeggi (Hg.), «Die Hoffnung stirbt zuletzt – Belarus im Jahre zwölf nach Tschernobyl» (mit Sergej Bruschko), AT Verlag, Aarau, 1998. 
 Peter Jaeggi und Peter Pfrunder (Hg.), «Hugo Jaeggi. Nahe am Menschen: Fotografien», Benteli, Bern, 2006.

References

External links 
 
 
 
 
 Swiss foundation for photography

1936 births
2018 deaths
Swiss photographers
Portrait photographers
People from Solothurn